Rahel Fseha Gebresilassie (born 3 November 1995) is an Ethiopian swimmer. She competed in the women's 50 metre freestyle event at the 2016 Summer Olympics. She finished fourth in the third heat and 75th overall with a time of 32.51, therefore failing to qualify for the semi-finals.

In 2019, she represented Ethiopia at the 2019 World Aquatics Championships held in Gwangju, South Korea. She competed in the women's 50 metre freestyle and women's 50 metre butterfly events. In both events she did not advance to compete in the semi-finals.

References

External links
 

1995 births
Living people
Ethiopian female swimmers
Olympic swimmers of Ethiopia
Swimmers at the 2016 Summer Olympics
Place of birth missing (living people)
Ethiopian female freestyle swimmers
Female butterfly swimmers
African Games competitors for Ethiopia
Swimmers at the 2015 African Games
Swimmers at the 2019 African Games
21st-century Ethiopian women